The 1929 Brownlow Medal was the sixth year the award was presented to the player adjudged the fairest and best player during the Victorian Football League (VFL) home and away season. Albert Collier of the Collingwood Football Club won the medal by polling six votes during the 1929 VFL season.

A new provision was introduced to suspend Brownlow Medal voting during rounds when the state team was active to avoid disadvantaging the players selected in the team. This provision was not repeated in future years.

Leading votegetters

References 

1929 in Australian rules football
1929